Ezov is the Classical Hebrew name of a plant mentioned in the Bible in the context of religious rituals. In some English-language Bibles, the word is transliterated as ezob. 

The Septuagint translates the name as ὕσσωπος hyssop, and English translations of the Bible often follow this rendering. The Hebrew word אזוב and the Greek word ὕσσωπος probably share a common (unknown) origin.

In the Bible, ezov is described as a small plant found on or near walls, with an aromatic odour.  Maimonides, Saadia Gaon and earlier Jewish commentators identified ezov with  za'atar, which  may refer to various local herbs, including marjoram, oregano and thyme, which have aromatic and cleansing properties, grow wild in Israel, and can easily be bunched together to be used for sprinkling.

The book of John in the New Testament (written in Koine Greek) mentions that hyssop was used, along with vinegar, to alleviate the thirst of Jesus, during his Passion. Matthew and Mark mention the occasion but refer to the plant using the general term κάλαμος (kálamos), which is translated as "reed" or "stick." Origanum has short stems and some scholars say it would have been too short to reach the mouth of Jesus during crucifixion. A number of scholars have proposed that ezov is the caper plant (Capparis spinosa), which the Arabs call azaf.  The caper is native throughout the Mediterranean Basin, and considered to have cleansing properties.

It has been suggested that Psalm 51's verse 7 "Purge me with hyssop, and I shall be clean:" is an early example of the medical use of Penicillium, the initial source of penicillin.

Ritual use

The Israelites used ezov in the Passover ritual when they were enslaved in Egypt, according to the Hebrew Bible and Old Testament, to sprinkle lamb's blood on the door posts and lintels of the slaves' quarters in which they lived, so that God would pass over them as he slew the first-born of the Egyptians. The Israelites used ezov more regularly for other rituals when they had settled in Israel. It was used in the ritual for cleansing from leprosy and for ritual purification. In Psalms, the sprinkling of ezov is used metaphorically to refer to purification of the heart.

The Roman Catholic Church and some sects interpret  as "hyssop" and have adopted the biblical practice of sprinkling with water to ritually cleanse objects, including churches and people, in a ritual termed aspersion during the Asperges.

References

Herbs
Plants in the Bible